Pathology  is a 2008 crime-horror film directed by Marc Schölermann, written by Mark Neveldine and Brian Taylor, and starring Milo Ventimiglia, Michael Weston, Alyssa Milano, and Lauren Lee Smith. The film premiered April 11, 2008 in the United Kingdom and opened in limited release in the United States on April 18, 2008.

Plot
The intro shows a camera recording faces of corpses, with their mouths being moved by medical residents.

Dr. Teddy Grey graduates at the top of his class from Harvard Medical School and joins one of the nation's most prestigious pathology residency programs. There, a rivalry develops between a group of interns and Teddy. They invite him into their group, which entertains itself with a secret after-hours game at the morgue of who can commit the perfect undetectable murder. Eventually the group's leader, Jake Gallo, realizes that Teddy is sleeping with his girlfriend, Juliette Bath. When Teddy catches several members of the group in lies, he realizes that what initially seemed like vigilante killings are, in reality, innocent people murdered for sport.

Teddy's fiancée Gwen arrives to stay with him in his apartment. Gallo, angered by Juliette's infidelity, kills her for the next game. However, just as they are about to begin the autopsy on Juliette (in the meantime plotting Teddy's death), Gallo realizes that the gas has been left on in the room.  Teddy rigged the gas to kill everyone in the group.  This results in a massive explosion as one of the group lights a crystal-meth pipe.  Everyone in the room is caught in the explosion.  Gallo realizes what is about to happen and survives. Teddy is seen walking away from the explosion.

Later, Gallo manages to kill Gwen in what he believes to be the "perfect murder". Upon completing his autopsy report on his murdered fiancée, Teddy is knocked out by Gallo and then is forced to trade verbal barbs with him. Teddy uses some of Gallo's own rhetoric against him in reverse psychology fashion, after which fellow pathologist Ben Stravinsky frees Teddy and together they kill Gallo in exactly the same way that he killed Teddy's fiancée. In the process, they vivisect Gallo.

Cast
Milo Ventimiglia as Dr. Ted Grey
Michael Weston as Dr. Jake Gallo
Alyssa Milano as Gwen Williamson
Lauren Lee Smith as Dr. Juliette Bath
Johnny Whitworth as Dr. Griffin Cavanaugh
John de Lancie as Dr. Quentin Morris
Mei Melançon as Dr. Catherine Ivy
Keir O'Donnell as Dr. Ben Stravinsky
Dan Callahan as Dr. Chip Bentwood
Larry Drake as Fat Bastard
Buddy Lewis as Harper Johnson
Alan Blumenfeld as Mr. Williamson
Deborah Pollack as Mrs. Williamson

Critical reception

The film received mixed reviews from critics. As of December 8, 2012, the review aggregator Rotten Tomatoes reported that 43% of critics gave the film positive reviews, based on 21 reviews. Metacritic reported the film had an average score of 55 out of 100, based on 8 reviews.

Production
The cast was announced on April 4, 2007 and filming started in May 2007.

Soundtrack
The soundtrack to Pathology was released on April 29, 2008.

References

External links

Trailer at bloody-disgusting.com
Pathology at movies.about.com

2008 films
American crime thriller films
2008 crime thriller films
Medical-themed films
2000s English-language films
Lakeshore Entertainment films
Metro-Goldwyn-Mayer films
Films produced by Gary Lucchesi
2000s American films